Anderson County Jr/Sr High School is a public secondary school in Garnett, Kansas, United States.  It serves students in grades 7–12 and the only high school operated by the Garnett USD 365 school district.  The school colors are red and white and the school mascot is the Bulldog.  The district serves residents of Anderson County, including Garnett, Greeley, Welda, and Westphalia.

Extracurricular activities

Athletics
The extracurricular activities offered at Anderson County Jr/Sr High School are relatively small and limited due to the school's small size. The Bulldogs are classified as a 4A school, the third-largest classification in Kansas according to the Kansas State High School Activities Association. Throughout its history, Anderson County has won two state championships, both in golf (1999, 2002).

State championships

See also
 List of high schools in Kansas
 List of unified school districts in Kansas

References

External links

 
 USD 365 School District Boundary Map, KDOT

Public high schools in Kansas
Schools in Anderson County, Kansas
Public middle schools in Kansas